This is a list of the 1988 PGA Tour Qualifying School graduates. 52 players earned their 1989 PGA Tour card through Q-School in 1988. The tournament was played over 108 holes at the PGA West (Nicklaus Resort course) and La Quinta Hotel Golf Club (Dunes course), in La Quinta, California. Those earning cards split the $100,000 purse, with the winner earning $15,000.

Sources:

References

PGA Tour Qualifying School
Golf in California
PGA Tour Qualifying School Graduates
PGA Tour Qualifying School Graduates